Brunfelsia portoricensis, the Puerto Rico raintree, is a species of flowering plant in the family Solanaceae. It is endemic to Puerto Rico, where it occurs in El Yunque National Forest.

This species is a shrub or tree usually growing one to three meters tall, but known to reach 4.5 meters at times. The thick, leathery, shiny green leaves are up to 15 centimeters long. The flowers have white petals each about 6 centimeters long, and yellow fruits. The plants are pollinated by hawkmoths.

The plant grows in low-elevation wet forest.

In 1998, there were thought to be about 300 individuals of the species remaining, scattered at 15 to 20 sites. Habitat is being lost to the establishment of tree plantations.

References

portoricensis
Endangered plants
Endemic flora of Puerto Rico
Taxonomy articles created by Polbot